A flexible barge is a non-rigid barge usually made of fabric.

History
This test ended on April 29 when the fabric of one of the two bags under tow developed a tear. There are various reasons why it has been difficult to gain support for demonstrating the viability of waterbag technology in California and around the world. A novel, Water, War, and Peace, has been completed that details the solutions waterbag technology offers to the complex political problems surrounding water issues throughout the Middle East, the United States, and the world.

The Norwegian company Nordic Water Supply developed a 10.800 m3 bag in 1997 under an agreement with the Turkish government to transport freshwater to Northern Cyprus. Within two years at least 7 million m3 of water had to be delivered annually at a cost of €2.7M per year, with volumes growing over time, but the actual transport only amounted to 4 million m3 in four years and the contract was discontinued by Turkish authorities. As a result, NWS went out of business and was de-listed from the Oslo Stock Exchange in 2003. NSW's waterbag technology was acquired by the Monohakobi Institute of Technology in Japan.

The REFRESH waterbag was developed by a consortium of companies and research institutes from Greece, Spain, Italy, Turkey and the Czech Republic within two European FP7 projects, REFRESH (running from 2010 to 2012) and the follow-up XXL-REFRESH (running from 2013 to 2015). The first project was focused on validation of the concept of modular waterbag; it developed a small scale prototype of 200 m3 capacity, tested in Greece in 2012. The second project was focused on scale-up and partial redesign of the REFRESH system. At the end of the second project the REFRESH waterbag concept reached commercial scale and a 2500 m3 system made of five 500m3 modules was tested offshore Spain in 2015. The length of the waterbag was 60 m long.

The REFRESH concept is different from concepts of waterbag proposed earlier, based on huge monolithic containers (as the one proposed by Nordic Water Supply) or "trains" of smaller containers each one being sealed in itself (as the Spragg bag). The REFRESH waterbag is made of a series of modules, each one being a cylinder open at both bases, joined by watertight zippers. This makes it possible to perform all "dry" operations on ground at the level of single modules, overcoming the handling problems of monolithic containers and improves the behaviour in navigation with respect to the "trains" of connected bags.

Technology

Zipper

Zippers play an important part in extending the capacity of the waterbag beyond what is practically achievable by a single textile piece. The Spragg and REFRESH concepts both feature prominently zippers, albeit with a fundamental difference in its function.

In the REFRESH design, the container itself is assembled on shore starting from planar cuts of fabric. Zippers run all along the perimeter of the fabric and make it possible to join an indefinite number of modules. Since each module is not closed by itself, zippers need to be watertight in order to ensure that no seawater leaks in.

Invention

The greater the volume of water that can be delivered per trip, the better the economics.

The REFRESH scheme is enabled by a specialty zipper, again developed by Ziplast, that uses a completely different tooth engagement design able to keep the strength of the original "Spragg" zipper while adding watertightness. Tests performed by the Spanish research centre AIMPLAS have confirmed that the zipper is able to stay watertight even when in tension.

Economics

Applications

Israeli President Shimon Peres has written a letter in support of implementing a demonstration of Spragg Bag technology in the Mediterranean Sea as a tool for helping to bring Peace to the Middle East. In this letter President Peres states, "The draft of WATER, WAR AND PEACE written as a novel is in my view an original approach to highlight this grave problem and its solutions, that will pave the path to a better and more peaceful region. Your efforts to embark on a demonstration voyage to enlighten us all, both regarding the technological viability as well as cost, will surely contribute to meet the critical dilemma." This view is shared by the REFRESH consortium.

Waterbags have been proposed to be used for emergency purposes in order to link the Gulf Cooperation Counsel countries' desalination plants all along the Persian Gulf coast. 

 could be used to move water through the Sacramento River Delta following an earthquake and a catastrophic levee collapse that could cut off Southern California's water supply for up to two years or more.

See also 
 International trade and water
 Water transportation
 Flexible intermediate bulk container

Footnotes

Sources
 Barlow, Maude, Blue Gold: The Battle Against Corporate Theft of the World's Water, Earthscan, 2003, 
 Fridell, Ron, Protecting Earth's Water Supply, Lerner Publications, 2008, 
 Gleick, Peter H.; The world's water: the biennial report on freshwater resources, Volume 1998, pp. 203-205, Spragg Waterbags, 
 Lawrence Journal-World – April 27, 1996; Giant water bags proposed to quench a dry planet's thirst
 McCabe, Michael, San Francisco Chronicle, August 6, 1999; Full of Holes, or in the Bag
 Snitow, Alan, Thirst: fighting the corporate theft of our water, Publisher John Wiley and Sons, 2007, 
 Westneat, Danny, The San Diego Union – Tribune, San Diego, Calif.:Apr 28, 1996. p. A-3, He hopes water-bag idea will float. 'Fabric pipeline' could slake thirst worldwide, [1,2 Edition]

External links
 Spragg waterbag site
 Demonstration of waterbag
 Documents prepared for Lester Snow, California Department of water resources
 Spragg waterbag technology comments pertaining to Battle Creek (California) Delta

Water supply